The Boston Foundation, founded in 1915, is one of the oldest and largest community foundations in the nation. Serving the Greater Boston area, it is made up of some 1,100 separate charitable funds established by thousands of donors over more than 100 years. Funds are set up either for the community or for special purposes, such as supporting individual nonprofit organizations or particular causes in perpetuity. Today, the foundation is the largest public charity and the largest grantmaker in New England, making more than $130 million in grants in FY2018. Since 2001, the Boston Foundation has also commissioned and published research, hosted forums and other platforms for discussion and public policy development, and joined or formed coalitions related to a wide range of challenges facing Boston and the region.

History 
The Boston Foundation was founded in 1915 by Charles E. and Charles M. Rogerson, who were father and son. Originally called the Permanent Charity Fund, it was the third community foundation in the United States, but it stood out for a new approach to philanthropy. It was the first community foundation to implement the idea of collecting funds from across an entire region and building an endowment to be used to improve the life of the community. Equally precedent-setting was the Rogersons’ notion of empowering a distribution committee, composed of prominent and knowledgeable citizens, to make grants on the basis of need—where they thought funds could do the greatest good. This coupled the long-term stability of endowment with the flexibility to disburse money responsively to meet changing community needs.

In 1985, the foundation was renamed The Boston Foundation, and Anna Faith Jones became its president—the first African-American woman to lead a major foundation in the United States. She was succeeded in 2001 by President and CEO Paul S. Grogan. During Grogan's tenure, the foundation launched efforts at civic engagement beyond grant-making, such as commissioning and publishing research into urban issues, holding public forums, forming task forces and coalitions, and informing legislative solutions to some of the city's intractable problems.

In 2012, the Boston Foundation merged with The Philanthropic Initiative (TPI), which has since operated as a distinct unit of the Foundation. TPI, founded in 1989, offers consulting services to high-net-worth individuals, families, foundations, and corporations nationally and globally.

In January 2020, Grogan announced that he was stepping down from his role upon the arrival of a replacement, and on December 1, 2020, the foundation announced that Grogan would be replaced by Emerson College President M. Lee Pelton. Pelton took office on June 1, 2021.

Mission 
As Greater Boston's community foundation since 1915, the Boston Foundation devotes its resources to building and sustaining a vital, prosperous city and region, where justice and opportunity are extended to everyone. It fulfills this mission in three principal ways:

 Making grants to nonprofit organizations and designing special funding initiatives to address this community's critical challenges;
 Working in partnership with donors to achieve high-impact philanthropy; and
 Serving as a civic hub and center of information, where ideas are shared, levers for change are identified, and common agendas for the future are developed.

Governance 
The foundation is overseen by a 20-member board of directors, selected for their experience and skills as well as to represent diverse community interests. The staff includes professionals in grant-making, fund-raising, research, finance, administration, and communications.

Grant-making 
Over its more than 100 years of grant-making, the foundation has given money to support organizations that aid immigrants, fight disease, improve education, reduce crime, and address other evolving systemic needs. It also backed numerous new ideas and institutions by providing seed capital and other support. Among its notable accomplishments are grants that helped launch WGBH-TV, now one of the nation's major public television stations. It also made an early investment in the redevelopment of Faneuil Hall into a central retail marketplace, often associated with Boston's renewal in the late 20th century; and helped to shape Boston's Longwood Medical Center area. The foundation invested in the most extensive network of community health centers in the nation and made grants to a group called Save the Harbor/Save the Bay to clean up Boston Harbor. What was once one of the filthiest harbors in the world became one of the cleanest. It also made early grants to numerous organizations that started in Boston and spread throughout the country, like Citizen Schools, City Year, GreenLight Fund, and Year Up.

Much of the foundation's giving in the 21st century comes through donor advised funds (DAFs). Each year, the Foundation and its donors make grants to hundreds of nonprofits in Greater Boston and across the country. From 2001 to 2021 the Foundation focused its giving on Housing and Community development, education and workforce Development Arts & Culture, Civic Engagement, Community Safety, Health and Human Services the nonprofit sector, and the urban environment.  The Foundation often takes on special initiatives to address pressing issues affecting the community, such as civic engagement, pilot schools, and homelessness prevention.

Civic leadership 
Through its Understanding Boston series, the Boston Foundation commissions research from universities, think tanks and other organizations and shares this information through a series of forums that are attended by thousands of people every year. Issues addressed through Understanding Boston embrace a broad range of issues, including public education, housing, the workforce, health, philanthropy and the nonprofit sector, the arts and the urban environment.

In addition to providing fresh information and bringing people together to discuss findings, the foundation also creates Task Forces and Action Agendas to produce positive change.  A number of issues have been influenced by this process.  The Commonwealth Housing Task Force created a Smart Growth housing effort to address the current shortage of housing in the state. The program has led to dozens of towns and cities building thousands of new units of housing. The Foundation's civic leadership also helped lead to the Massachusetts Cultural Facilities Fund, which has provided millions in state funding for cultural facilities. Its work examining the current Criminal Offender Record Information (CORI) system has led to a complete re-evaluation of the system by state lawmakers. The Foundation's research and public information campaign related to public education has influenced the Governor's approach to education across the state. Other issues that have benefited from the foundation's civic leadership include preventing homelessness, a new collaborative for the life sciences, issues related to health and health care and the revenue-raising capacity of Massachusetts cities.

Boston Indicators Project 
The foundation's civic leadership also extends to its Boston Indicators Project. The project relies on the expertise of hundreds of stakeholders gathered together in multiple convenings to frame its conclusions, and draw data from the wealth of information and research generated by the region's excellent public agencies, civic institutions, think tanks, and community-based organizations. The Boston Foundation will release a biennial report, with supplemental updates and outreach, through the year 2030, Boston's 400th anniversary.
 
Boston Indicators offers new ways to understand Boston and its neighborhoods in a regional context.  It aims to democratize access to information, foster informed public discourse, track progress on share civic goals, and report on change in 10 sectors: Civic Vitality,  Cultural Life and the Arts, the Economy, Education, the Environment,  Health, Housing, Public Safety, Technology and Transportation.

The project's first report, The Wisdom of Our Choices, was released in 2000. The second report, Creativity and Innovation: A Bridge to the Future, was released in early 2003, along with the launch of the Project's interactive website, which received the International Tech Museum Award that year for using technology to further equality. The third report, Thinking Globally/Acting Locally: A Regional Wake-Up Call, was released in 2005, with an enhanced website. The most recent report, released in 2007, is titled A Time Like No Other: Charting the Course of the Next Revolution.

All Boston Indicators Project reports are available online at http://www.bostonindicators.org.  The website provides sector highlights, indicators with data available for download, and features such as the Hub of Innovation,  Links & Resources, and a Data Portal to other data-rich sites. New research from area and national sources is posted on a regular basis.

References

External links
 The Persistent Poverty Project records, 1985–2002 are located in the Northeastern University Libraries, Archives and Special Collections Department, Boston, MA.

Community foundations
Non-profit organizations based in Massachusetts